

Films

References 

2023
2023 in LGBT history
Lists of 2023 films